The following article presents a summary of the 1969 football (soccer) season in Brazil, which was the 68th season of competitive football in the country.

Torneio Roberto Gomes Pedrosa

Final Stage

Palmeiras declared as the Torneio Roberto Gomes Pedrosa champions.

State championship champions

Youth competition champions

Other competition champions

Brazilian clubs in international competitions

Brazil national team
The following table lists all the games played by the Brazil national football team in official competitions and friendly matches during 1969.

References

 Brazilian competitions at RSSSF
 1969 Brazil national team matches at RSSSF

 
Seasons in Brazilian football
Brazil